Major-General Sir Cecil Edward Bingham  (7 December 1861 – 31 May 1934) was a British Army officer who held high command during World War I.

Military career
Born the son of Charles Bingham, 4th Earl of Lucan, Bingham was commissioned into the 3rd The King's Own Hussars in 1882 and transferred to the 2nd Regiment of Life Guards in 1886 and the 1st Regiment of Life Guards in 1892. He served in the Second Boer War  in 1900 as Aide-de-camp to Major-General John French, commanding the Cavalry division. After returning home, he became senior aide-de-Camp to the Duke of Connaught during his Indian Tour in 1903. He was appointed Commander of the 2nd Cavalry Brigade in November 1910 and Commander of the 4th Cavalry Brigade in November 1911. He served in World War I as Commander of the 4th Cavalry Brigade with the British Expeditionary Force and then as General Officer Commanding 1st Cavalry Division from May 1915. In October 1915 he was given command of the Cavalry Corps in France, relinquishing command in March 1916 in order to take over command of the reserve centre at Ripon. In November 1916 he was appointed to command 73rd Division, a formation composed of Home Service men of the Territorial Force, which was stationed in Essex and Hertfordshire for coastal defence. He relinquished this command in April 1917, and was transferred to take command of the 67th (2nd Home Counties) Division. He held this command until the division was disbanded in 1919.

Family
In 1884 he married Rose Ellinor Guthrie, daughter of James Alexander Guthrie, 4th Baron of Craigie; she died 18 September 1908. They had three children: 
 Lieutenant-Colonel Ralph Charles Bingham, DSO, Coldstream Guards, born 15 April 1885.
 Lieutenant David Cecil Bingham, Coldstream Guards, born 18 March 1887, killed in action in France 14 September 1914.
 Cecilia Mary Lavinia Bingham, born 19 April 1893, married Colonel Frederick George Beaumont-Nesbitt, Grenadier Guards and died 26 August 1920.

In 1911 he married Alys Elizabeth Carr, formerly Mrs Samuel Sloane Chauncey, of New York City, daughter of Col. Henry Montgomery Carr, of Louisville, Kentucky, USA.

References

1861 births
1934 deaths
British Army major generals
British Army cavalry generals of World War I
3rd The King's Own Hussars officers
British Life Guards officers
Knights Grand Cross of the Royal Victorian Order
Knights Commander of the Order of St Michael and St George
Companions of the Order of the Bath
Younger sons of earls
British Army personnel of the Second Boer War
Bingham family (Ireland)